The European Community Championship was a professional tennis tournament held from 1982 until 1998 in Antwerp, Belgium.  The tournament was held as a special invitational/exhibition event run outside the Grand Prix series and did not distribute any ATP ranking points until 1992, when the tournament became part of the ATP Tour. While an exhibition tournament, invitations were extended to players who won a tournament title in Europe during that year. The surface of the tournament was indoor carpet.

The inaugural event was held in December 1982, with a $700,000 purse on offer for 24 players. At that time, the high level (Super Series) European Grand Prix events like the Italian Open or indoor tournament in Wembley, London offered only $300,000 and $200,000 respectively.

It was called the European Champions' Championship and from 1986 was renamed the European Community Championship (ECC). Its nickname was the "Gold Racquet" tournament because if a player won the tournament thrice within a 5-year span, he would also receive a special trophy, a life-size, 13.2-pound gold racquet studded with 1,420 diamonds valued at $1,000,000, created by the artist Varozza. This inspired the Proximus Diamond Games, a WTA Tour event held in Antwerp since 2002, to have a similar trophy system.

In 1985, Ivan Lendl won his third title within 4 years and received the $200,000 winners prize together with the Gold Racquet. In 1991, Boris Becker spoiled Lendl's quest for a $1,250,000 million prize ($250,000 prize money plus the $1,000,000 racquet) at the ECC in Antwerp by beating him 6–4, 7–5 in the semifinals. Had Lendl won, he would have kept the gold-and-diamond racquet trophy valued at about $1,000,000, adding to his from 1985. He was in the running for a second after victories in 1987 and 1989, but wound up with only $100,000 that year.

Past finals

Singles

Doubles

See also
 European Open

References 
World of Tennis annuals

 
Tennis tournaments in Belgium
Exhibition tennis tournaments
Indoor tennis tournaments
Defunct tennis tournaments in Europe
Defunct sports competitions in Belgium
Carpet court tennis tournaments
Hard court tennis tournaments